Senator Daniel may refer to:

Members of the United States Senate
Charles E. Daniel (1895–1964), U.S. Senator from South Carolina
John W. Daniel (1842–1910), U.S. Senator from Virginia
Price Daniel (1910–1988), U.S. Senator from Texas

United States state senate members
C. Welborn Daniel (1926–2016), Florida State Senate
Robert Williams Daniel (1884–1940), Virginia State Senate
Warren Daniel (born 1968), North Carolina State Senate
William Daniel (Maryland politician) (1826–1897), Maryland State Senate
Allen Daniel Jr. (1772–1836), Georgia State Senate
Warren F. Daniell (1826–1913), New Hampshire State Senate

See also
Senator Daniels (disambiguation)
Senator O'Daniel (disambiguation)